The following is a list of notable events and releases that happened in 2017 in music in Australia.

Events

January

February

March

April

May
 13 May – Australia's representative in the Eurovision Song Contest 2017, Isaiah Firebrace, finishes in ninth place with 173 points for the song "Don't Come Easy".

June

July
21–23 July – Splendour in the Grass 2017 is held at North Byron Parklands in Yelgun, New South Wales, headlined by The xx, Queens of the Stone Age and LCD Soundsystem.

August

September

October

November

December

Bands disbanded

Album and Single releases

Albums

February

April

August

November

December

Singles
10 February - What Can I Do If the Fire Goes Out? by Gang of Youths
9 March - Big Night Out by Butterfingers
17 March - In Motion by Allday
23 March - Feel Good by Kwame
23 March - Friends by Kwame
27 March - No Time by B-Nasty
28 March - Moments by Bliss n Eso
14 April - Blue by Bliss n Eso
28 April - Believe by Bliss n Eso
4 May - Here by Briggs
5 May - Hyperreal by Flume
10 May - Cloud 9 by Baker Boy
18 May - Richman by Downsyde
26 May - Let Me Down Easy by Gang of Youths
16 June - Drunk Together by Jai Waetford
22 June - Late Nights by Carmouflage Rose
9 August - The Deepest Sighs, the Frankest Shadows by Gang of Youths
17 August - Champagne by Jai Waetford
1 September - A Dark Machine by ShockOne
22 September - Yesterday by 360
6 October - Marryuna by Baker Boy
20 October - Girl with a Suntan by Jai Waetford
27 October - Way Out by 360
27 October - Go Bang by Pnau
10 November - Back in the Game by Downsyde
14 December - We Don't Have To by Jai Waetford
29 November - The Heart Is a Muscle'' by Gang of Youths

Deaths

2 January - Auriel Andrew, 69, singer
22 January - Geoffrey Gurrumul Yunupingu, 46, musician
13 February - Carol Lloyd, 68, singer, songwriter, composer
19 July - Graham Wood, 45, musician
2 August - Tony Cohen, 60, record producer, sound engineer
16 October - Iain Shedden, 60, drummer
22 October - George Young, 70, musician, songwriter, record producer
18 November - Malcolm Young, 64, musician, guitarist, songwriter, producer

See also
Australia in the Eurovision Song Contest 2017
List of number-one singles of 2017 (Australia)
List of number-one albums of 2017 (Australia)

References

 
Australian
Australian music